Qulonji (also Romanized as Qūlonjī; also known as Ghoolanji and Kulungi) is a village in Anzal-e Jonubi Rural District of Anzal District of Urmia County, West Azerbaijan province, Iran. At the 2006 National Census, its population was 4,955 in 1,224 households. The following census in 2011 counted 5,248 people in 1,602 households. The latest census in 2016 showed a population of 5,192 people in 1,566 households; it was the largest village in its rural district.

References 

Urmia County

Populated places in West Azerbaijan Province

Populated places in Urmia County